Erika Leticia Valdés Samaniego (born 20 July 1983) is a Mexican former professional tennis player.

Biography
A right-handed player from Mexico City, Valdés represented the Mexico Fed Cup team from 1999 to 2002, playing in a total of seven ties.

As a professional player she reached a career best singles ranking of 402 and won two ITF titles. She twice featured as a wildcard in the main draw of the Mexican Open WTA Tour tournament, in 2001 and 2002. On both occasions she was eliminated in the first round, which included a loss to defending champion Amanda Coetzer in the 2002 edition.

In 2003 she ended her professional career to play college tennis in the United States at Tulane University. She won a bronze medal for Mexico in the women's doubles at the 2003 Summer Universiade.

Valdés was a member of the Mexican squad for the 2003 Pan American Games in Santo Domingo but didn't participate in the tournament. She had travelled to Santo Domingo and an injury replacement for Jessica Fernández, however due to Mexico's authorities failing to notify the event organisers of this change in time, she was unable to take her place in the draw.

ITF circuit finals

Singles: 3 (1–2)

Doubles: 3 (0–3)

References

External links
 
 
 

1983 births
Living people
Mexican female tennis players
Tulane Green Wave women's tennis players
Universiade medalists in tennis
Universiade bronze medalists for Mexico
Tennis players from Mexico City
Medalists at the 2003 Summer Universiade
21st-century Mexican women